Malacocoris chlorizans (commonly known as delicate apple capsid) is a species of plant bugs belonging to the family Miridae, subfamily Orthotylinae.

Description

Distribution
It is found in Europe (mainly absent from Albania, Azores, Canary Islands, Cyprus, Faroe Islands, Iceland, Liechtenstein, Madeira, Malta and North Macedonia). and east to the Caspian sea.

Ecology
Malacocoris chlorizans is found in deciduous trees, especially in hazel where it feeds on mites and aphids. Adults fly from May to October.

References

External links
Malacocoris chlorizans

Insects described in 1794
Hemiptera of Europe
Miridae